Dr. Vicki Gardiner FRACI CChem CompIEAust is the current General Manager of the Tasmania Division of Engineers Australia.

Education

Graduating with a BSc (Hons), Gardiner went on to do her PhD in Synthetic Chemistry at Monash University from 1994-1997. In 2005, she also attained a Graduate Certificate in Management, specialising in Project Management, from the University of New England (AU).

Career

After graduating with a PhD from Monash University, Gardiner attained Post-Doctoral positions at both the University of Southampton and University of New South Wales. From 2000-2004, Gardiner was an Australian Research Council (ARC) Post-Doctoral Fellow and lecturer at the University of Tasmania.

Following on from her time spent in academia, Gardiner moved to industry, and attained a position as Customer Service Manager at AusIndustry (Department of Innovation, Industry, Science and Research). Her capacity in this role involved promoting innovation in new product, process and service development. Gaining three years of experience in this field, Gardiner then transferred to the biotechnology company Marinova. As operations manager at Marinova, she was involved in research and development activities, supply chain management and various business development areas.

In 2013, Engineers Australia announced that Gardiner had accepted a position as the new General Manager of their Tasmania Division, where she currently still works.

Projects

During 2010-2011, Gardiner took on the role of Convenor for the Royal Australian Chemical Institute International Year of Chemistry, overseeing the Institute's activities that focussed on the role of chemistry in the daily lives of people. The event involved a travelling exhibition focussing on art-meets-chemistry and was featured at the 2011 Prime Minister's Science Awards.

As part of the 2011 National Science Week program, Gardiner co-authored the education resource book titled "React to Chemistry"

Organisations

Gardiner has contributed to the following organisations, in the following roles:

 Board member, as well as Hon. General Secretary, of the Royal Australian Chemical Institute (2007-2011) and President (2019-2020).
 Member of the National Chemistry Committee of the Australian Academy of Science (2011-2013). 
 Advisory Board member of the Tasmania Major Projects Approval Agency (2014).

Awards and honours

Gardiner was elected Companion of Engineers Australia in 2013, Fellow of the Royal Australian Chemical Institute, and is the recipient of the 2012 RK Murphy Medal granted by the Royal Australian Chemical Institute.

References

Australian scientists
Australian women scientists
Monash University alumni
Living people
Year of birth missing (living people)